Asiconops is a subgenus of flies from the genus Conops in the family Conopidae.

The European species of the subgenus are:
C. elegans Meigen, 1824
C. flavifrons Meigen, 1824
C. insignis Loew, 1848
C. longiventris Kröber, 1916
C. weinbergae Camras & Chvála, 1984

References 

Parasitic flies
Conopidae
Insect subgenera